Rajinder Kumar (born 3 April 1993, in Chandigarh) is an Indian footballer who plays as a forward for Bharat FC in the I-League.

Career

Pailan Arrows
Kumar made his professional debut for Pailan Arrows on 19 September 2012 against Dempo S.C. in the first match of the 2012 Indian Federation Cup where Pailan drew against the reigning I-League champions 1–1. Kumar scored his first ever goal of his career on 12 January 2013 against Air India FC in the I-League at the Balewadi Sports Complex in Pune to help Pailan Arrows draw the match 1–1.

United
Kumar signed for United S.C. in January 2014. He made his debut on 14 January 2014 in the Indian Federation Cup match against Churchill Brothers at Jawaharlal Nehru Stadium, Kochi in which he came on as a substitute for C. K. Vineeth in the 63rd minute as United lost the match 2-1.

Career statistics

Club

References

1993 births
Living people
Indian footballers
I-League players
Footballers from Chandigarh
Indian Arrows players
United SC players
India youth international footballers
Association football forwards